Re:member is FLOW's ninth single. Its A-Side was used as the eighth opening theme song for the anime series Naruto. It reached #12 on the Oricon charts in its first week and charted for 8 weeks. The single received a Gold certification in January 2014 from the Recording Industry Association of Japan, for reaching 100,000 music downloads.

Track listing
Track listing adapted from Sony Music Entertainment Japan.

References

2006 singles
2006 songs
Flow (band) songs
Ki/oon Music singles
Naruto songs